Whitstable Lifeboat Station is a Royal National Lifeboat Institution (RNLI) station located in Whitstable in the English county of Kent. 

The station was established in 1963, and has always operated an inflatable inshore lifeboat. The current lifeboat is a  named Lewisco (B-877) which has been on the station since 2014. Boathouse accommodation has been improved over the years, with a single storey extension added to the side to improve crew facilities in 1989, and a new boathouse completed in 2000.

A number of awards have been made to Whitstable crew. These include, between 1977 and 2010, one RNLI bronze medal and four "Thanks of the Institution inscribed on Vellum" for bravery during rescues. The station also received the RNLI’s "Walter and Elizabeth Groombridge Annual Award" for the most meritorious rescue by an inshore lifeboat crew in 2009. In the 2003 New Year Honours David Andrew Lamberton, the station's honorary secretary, was appointed a member of the Order of the British Empire for his services to the RNLI.

The annual "Dan Davies Competition" is held in the memory of Whitstable general practitioner Dan Davies, who served as medical officer to the lifeboat station.

Fleet

Gallery

References 

History of Kent
Lifeboat stations in Kent
Whitstable